KTUL (channel 8) is a television station in Tulsa, Oklahoma, United States, affiliated with ABC and owned by Sinclair Broadcast Group. The station's studios are located at Lookout Mountain (near South 29th West Avenue, west of Interstate 244) in southwestern Tulsa, and its transmitter is located on South 321st Avenue East, adjacent to the Muskogee Turnpike, in unincorporated southeastern Tulsa County (near Coweta).

History

Griffin-Leake ownership

Early history in Muskogee
John Toole "J. T." Griffin – majority owner and president of wholesale food distributors Griffin Grocery Company and Denison Peanut Company, and hardware manufacturer Western Hardware Corporation, all of which were headquartered in Muskogee – became interested in television broadcasting around 1950, after noticing during one of his commutes that many homes in the Oklahoma City area had installed outdoor television antennas to receive the signal of primary NBC affiliate WKY-TV (now KFOR-TV) in Oklahoma City, which signed on as Oklahoma's first television station on June 6, 1949. About one year later, the Tulsa Broadcasting Company – a company run by John and his sister, Marjory Griffin Leake, which already owned Tulsa-based radio station KTUL (1430 AM, now KTBZ) and KFPW in Fort Smith, Arkansas – filed an application to the Federal Communications Commission (FCC) for a construction permit to build and license to operate a television station on VHF channel 8 on June 27, 1952. (Incidentally, in 1949, Tulsa Broadcasting had assigned Helen Alvarez – who would become founding part-owner of KOTV (channel 6) – to study whether a television station venture in Tulsa could be successful. Tulsa Broadcasting executives ultimately decided that it would be too risky for apply for a television license at that point, even though the study results and Alvarez herself suggested that the company file an application as soon as possible.)

(The FCC would later assign VHF channel 3 to Eufaula, a non-commercial educational allocation that would be granted to the Oklahoma Educational Television Authority [OETA] for satellite station KOET, which launched on December 1, 1977.) The channel 6 allocation had already been assigned to KOTV and channel 2 was in the midst of a competition between Central Plains Enterprises (which signed on KVOO-TV [channel 2, now KJRH-TV] on that channel on December 5, 1954), the Oil Capital Television Corporation and the Fryer Television Company for that license. The third (and last) VHF frequency allocated to the Tulsa market – channel 11 – had been reserved by the FCC for a non-commercial educational licensee (that allocation is now occupied by PBS member station and OETA satellite KOED, which launched on January 12, 1959), while the UHF band was considered unviable at the time as most television sets on the retail market then were not equipped with UHF tuners (this situation would not change until after the All-Channel Receiver Act took effect in 1961).

The Griffin-owned group saw competition crop up for the channel 8 permit over the next two years. The Oklahoma Press Publishing Company – a group majority owned by Tams Bixby Jr. and son Tams Bixby III, which The published the Muskogee Phoenix and Times-Democrat and owned Muskogee radio station KBIX (1490 AM) – filed a separate application for the channel 8 license on October 9, 1952; then on November 20, 1953, Southern California Telephone Company co-owner Ashley L. Robison (who would later acquire KOCO-TV in Oklahoma City in 1957) submitted the third permit application to build a television station on channel 8. Over time, Tulsa Broadcasting's competitors for the permit withdrew their respective applications. Oklahoma Press Publishing had its bid dismissed by an FCC petition grant on February 19, 1954; Robison backed out of the running by petition two weeks later on March 1. (Robison received $6,000 to pay legal expenses incurred through the bid's prosecution.) Following by an initial decision issued by FCC Hearing Examiner Millard French that recommended approval of its application, the FCC granted the permit to Tulsa Broadcasting on April 8, 1954.

Because its city of license precluded applying the calls used by KTUL radio to the new television station, Tulsa Broadcasting – per advice given to company attorneys to seek a callsign that contained the letters "TV" – decided to assign KTVX as the station's call letters, after Griffin discovered that the calls had been dormant since the S.S. William S. Clark turned in the signal code to the Customs Bureau of the United States Department of the Treasury upon the ocean vessel's January 1947 retirement. A stumbling block for the Griffins came on May 7, 1954, when Albec Oil founder J. Elfred Beck, owner of fledgling UHF outlet KCEB (channel 23, now defunct; allocation now occupied by Fox affiliate KOKI-TV), filed a protest motion asking for the FCC to revoke or stay the grant. Beck cited that the proposed  transmitter tower on Concharty Mountain (in the Wagoner County town of Stone Bluff) would produce overlap of Grade A signal coverage between KTVX and KWTV, and would permit dual coverage of both Muskogee and Tulsa in violation with the agency's channel allocation table. In addition, the Griffins ownership of KWTV, the KTUL and KFPW radio stations, KATV in Little Rock-Pine Bluff, Arkansas, and Oklahoma City radio station KOMA (now KOKC) was cited in Beck's complaint as constituting undue concentration of control. KOTV owner Wrather-Alvarez Inc. and Arthur R. Olson, permitee for the license of the then-unlaunched KSPG (channel 17, now defunct; allocation now occupied by Bartlesville-based TBN owned-and-operated station KDOR-TV) submitted their own petitions that made very similar allegations against Tulsa Broadcasting two weeks later. On July 9, the FCC denied the protest petitions were invalid as the grant was handed down after a hearing. All three petitioners appealed the ruling to the D.C. Court of Appeals, which would deny their request to stay the construction of KTVX.

The station first signed on the air as KTVX at 12:30 p.m. on September 18, 1954. The first program ever broadcast on KTVX on that afternoon was an ABC telecast of a college football game between the University of Oklahoma Sooners and the California Golden Bears, in which the Sooners won 27–13. Although KTUL radio had been an affiliate of the CBS Radio Network since 1933 (it would switch its affiliation to the Mutual Broadcasting System in 1959), channel 8 has operated as an ABC affiliate since its sign-on; this was essentially by default, as CBS Television had already maintained a primary affiliation with KOTV since it signed on in October 1949. KTVX assumed the rights to the ABC affiliation from KCEB, whose demise is directly linked to KTVX's sign-on; ABC's decision to move its programming full-time to channel 8 as well as the pending operational wind-down of the DuMont Television Network (a non-viable fourth network that itself would soon fold in August 1956) ended Beck's hopes to make his station viable, leaving him little choice but to shut down channel 23 on December 4, 1954. The station's original studio facilities were based inside a  facility inside a converted grocery store on East Side Boulevard and Houston Street in northwestern Muskogee. The current studio facility on Lookout Mountain in west Tulsa (which originally spanned ) originally served as an auxiliary studio for the station, which Tulsa Broadcasting had purchased from KCEB – for whom the facility was originally built – shortly before the station's sign-on as channel 23 was preparing to cease operations.

The earlier charges pertaining to KTVX's transmitter location resurfaced that April, when KOTV owner General Television and KVOO-TV parent Central Plains Enterprises filed complaints requesting that FCC force KTVX to cease representing itself as a Tulsa station – at the time, channel 8 identified as such or as a Muskogee-Tulsa station in on-air and print promotions – or face an agency hearing. Station management replied in a counter-filing that it saw nothing wrong in promoting itself as a Tulsa market station, and suggested that these and other issues raised in the complaint considered to be unfair trade practices should be appealed to the Federal Trade Commission instead. The FCC dismissed the complaint on September 2, noting that there were issues with past violations and inaccurate claims pertaining to its facilities and signal coverage; Tulsa Broadcasting admitted to failing to comply with station identification rules, but made assurances that it stopped such practices.

Transfer to Tulsa
On January 18, 1955, Tulsa Broadcasting filed a request to move KTVX's city of license to Tulsa, claiming that Muskogee was not large enough to support a VHF station, that the move would put it at a better advantage with its Tulsa-based competitors, and that it would provide a third competitive station in Tulsa. Central Plains and General Television opposed the move and asked that KTVX remain licensed to Muskogee and relegated to a UHF channel if the channel 8 allocation were reassigned to Tulsa, citing that Tulsa Broadcasting had "engaged in a pattern of inconsistent, misleading and incorrect representations to the [FCC]" and that it had been operating as a de facto Tulsa station with limited equipment and personnel based in Muskogee. Arthur Olson stated in his petition filing that he would have applied for channel 8 instead of UHF channel 17 for KSPG had it had been allocated to Tulsa. Station manager L. A. [Bud] Blust, Jr. had arranged for some of the station's transmission equipment to be moved to the Lookout Mountain auxiliary studio in early 1955, months before KTVX moved most of its operations into the building that November; KTUL radio had earlier moved into the facility in April 1955. KTUL began auxiliary operations at the Lookout Mountain building on November 1, 1955, with that evening's airing of the local book review program Lewis Meyer Bookshelf.

After submitting a second relocation request eight months earlier on January 18, the FCC granted the reassignment of the KTVX license and its accompanying VHF channel 8 allocation to Tulsa on August 2, 1957. Incidentally, FCC regulations had been changed in 1952 to allow for a broadcast station to house their main studio within  of their city of license, which would have allowed channel 8 to remain licensed to Muskogee but base its operations solely in Tulsa (a television station would not be licensed to Muskogee again until September 12, 1999, when a joint venture of Tulsa Communications and Tulsa Channel 19, LLC signed on WB affiliate KWBT [channel 19, now CW affiliate KQCW-DT]). On September 12, the day the move to Tulsa was approved by the FCC, the station changed its call letters to KTUL-TV to match its radio sister (the "-TV" suffix would be excised from the callsign on February 22, 1993; the KTVX call sign is currently used by another ABC-affiliated television station in Salt Lake City, Utah). KTUL radio (which,  under the KTBZ calls, is now owned by iHeartMedia) was sold to the Wichita Falls, Texas–based Texoma Broadcasting Company—a group co-owned by Raymond Ruff and Charles A. Sammons that, in compliance with a since-repealed FCC rule that prohibited separately owned radio and television stations based in the same city from sharing the same base call letters, changed its calls to KELI after the sale was finalized—for $450,000 in July 1961; the Griffin-Leake interests retained ownership of KTUL-TV.

Sole ownership by Leake
In November 1963, the Griffin-Leake interests reached an agreement to buy out the respective 25% interests in KWTV held by former Oklahoma Governor Roy J. Turner and Luther Dulaney – which had expanded their interest in the Oklahoma City station in August 1962, after RKO General sold its stake in KWTV to address ownership issues related to RKO's multi-layered purchase-swap transaction involving WRC-TV and WRC-AM-FM (now WTEM and WKYS) in Washington, D.C., WNAC-TV (now defunct; former channel allocation now occupied by WHDH), WNAC-AM (now WRKO) and WRKO-FM (now WBZ-FM) in Boston, the WRCV television and radio stations (now KYW-TV and KYW [AM]) in Philadelphia, and the Washington-based WGMS radio stations (now WWRC and WTOP-FM) – for an initial payment of $200,000 and title rights to the equipment used by KWTV, KTUL and KATV. Turner and Dulaney would then sell the equipment, valued at $2.3 million, to First National Bank of Oklahoma City executives C.A. Voss and James Kite for $3 million. In turn, the three Griffin-Leake stations would be folded into a single corporate umbrella under KATV parent licensee KATV Inc. (subsequently rechristened as Griffin-Leake TV), which would enter into a ten-year equipment leasing agreement with Voss and Kite for a total of $4.5 million (or $37,500 per month). Griffin and the Leakes would own approximately all of the common voting stock and collectively own 84% of nonvoting common shares in KATV Inc. post-merger, with 10% of the remaining nonvoting interest held by Edgar Bell (who would remain executive vice president and general manager at KWTV).

Shortly afterward, KTUL upgraded its transmission equipment to allow carriage of ABC programming in color; the station would later begin producing its local programming in color on February 21, 1967. In April 1969, Griffin-Leake TV announced that it would break up its holdings into two separate companies. James C. "Jimmy" Leake – who had moved from being a 3.5% minority partner in KTUL to half-owner as a result of the earlier investor divestitures – retained ownership of KATV, KTUL, Ponca City-based cable television operator Cable TV Co. and a controlling 80% interest in the construction permit for Fajardo, Puerto Rico television station WSTE (now WORO-DT), while Griffin retained ownership of KWTV under the licensee Century Communications Co. (Griffin's company, which eventually became Griffin Communications, would re-enter the Tulsa market when it purchased KOTV in October 2000.) In 1979, KTUL began running one of the most successful station image campaigns in the United States with the debut of its "8's the Place" promotions. Developed by promotions manager and former local program host Carl Bartholomew, and lasting until the campaign was discontinued in November 1992, the spots prominently featured the "8's the Place" on various objects and people including station personalities such as John Chick, program host Sue Staggs and anchor Diane Elliott.

Allbritton ownership
On November 3, 1982, Leake Industries sold KTUL and KATV to Washington, D.C.-based Allbritton Communications in an all-cash transaction for $80 million; the sale received FCC approval on February 14, 1983. The purchase marked the second time in which Allbritton acquired a television station in Oklahoma; as Washington Star Communications, in March 1977, the company attempted to purchase fellow ABC affiliate KOCO-TV in Oklahoma City in a trade deal with the Combined Communications Corporation for the Star's Washington D.C. flagship station WMAL-TV (now WJLA-TV) and approximately $65 million in Combined nonvoting stock to offset monetary losses of the company's then-namesake newspaper The Washington Star; that deal was terminated weeks after Star Communications' February 1978 sale of the Star newspaper to Time Inc.

On December 26, 1987, the Coweta transmitter facility (which was used by independent station KGCT-TV [channel 41, now MyNetworkTV affiliate KMYT-TV] and several local radio stations to house their transmitters at the time) collapsed due to heavy freezing rain, caused by a major ice storm over the Christmas weekend that affected much of northeastern Oklahoma; at least  of ice had accumulated on the tower. Channel 8 subsequently restored service to cable television subscribers via a direct studio feed that it relayed to Tulsa Cable Television (which would eventually have its franchise rights transferred to United Artists Cable, Tele-Communications, Inc., and finally, to Cox Communications, which has owned the Tulsa cable franchise since April 2000). Both KTUL and KGCT restored over-the-air service later that week after the stations rented a portable temporary tower brought in from Florida. Within days, the stations leased a tower shared by KJRH, KOTV and PBS member and OETA satellite station KOED-TV (channel 11), where their transmitters resided until a new  tower was constructed near the existing Coweta tower site in the summer of 1988.

On January 6, 1992, channel 8 began maintaining a 24-hour-a-day programming schedule on Sunday through Fridays, adding a mix of syndicated feature films and the ABC overnight news program World News Now to fill overnight timeslots (the station continued to sign-off from 2:00 to 5:00 a.m. on Saturday night/early Sunday mornings until January 1999). In November 1992, the station began identifying as "Oklahoma's Channel 8" for general purposes and Oklahoma's News 8 for its local newscasts (adding the possessive "Oklahoma's" to the station's existing branding), introducing a logo featuring the station branding and gold serif "8" over an image of the state of Oklahoma. In June 1998, ABC parent The Walt Disney Company entered into negotiations to purchase the eight Allbritton stations and its local marketing agreements involving fellow ABC affiliates WJSU-TV (now WGWW) in Anniston, Alabama and WJXX in Jacksonville, Florida, for a reported offer totaling more than $1 billion; the latter two stations had been involved in an affiliation deal between Allbritton and ABC that was reached in response to the May 1994 affiliation deal between New World Communications and Fox that affected WBRC in Birmingham, Alabama. Negotiations between Disney and Allbritton broke down when the former dropped out of discussions to buy the stations the following month. Had the ABC offer been successfully brokered, KTUL would have become the first commercial television station in the Tulsa market (and the state of Oklahoma, in general) to have served as an owned-and-operated station of a major broadcast television network.

On November 2, 1999, KTUL unveiled an additional  of studio space on the eastern portion of the Lookout Mountain facility, which included an expanded newsroom referred to as the "Newscenter" (which is designed in the style of the "newsplex" set pioneered by WSVN in Miami, which integrates the main anchor desk and weather center into the newsroom), a new sales office, and a  deck outside the studio for use in weather segments that overlooks the downtown Tulsa skyline. The expanded area – which began construction in May 1998, and cost $2 million to build – allowed for station personnel (who previously worked throughout two floors and in various conference rooms and studios within the building) to work in the same area. Concurrent with the unveiling of the newsroom-studio combination, the station changed its on-air branding to Oklahoma's NewsChannel 8; at that time, KTUL became the second Tulsa-area television station to have used the "NewsChannel" moniker, which had previously been used by KJRH-TV for its news branding – as NewsChannel 2 – from August 1992 until November 1994, when that station adopted a short-lived watered-down version of WSVN's newscast format. (The state possessive was removed from the branding in February 2006, as part of a graphical overhaul that included the introduction of the station's current logo.) In January 2013, the station changed its branding to "Tulsa's Channel 8".

Acquisition by Sinclair
On July 29, 2013, Allbritton announced that it would sell its seven television stations, including KTUL, to the Hunt Valley, Maryland–based Sinclair Broadcast Group for $985 million, in order to concentrate the company's operations exclusively around its political news website, Politico. The sale's regulatory process was held up for nearly a year, however, as Sinclair attempted to address ownership issues involving stations it already operated in three markets (WTTO/WDBB and WABM in Birmingham, Alabama, WMMP in Charleston, South Carolina, and WHP-TV and WLYH-TV in Harrisburg, Pennsylvania) and Albritton-owned stations that placed Sinclair in conflict with FCC regulations on local station ownership (WBMA/WCFT/WJSU, WCIV and WHTM, respectively), specifically with regard to LMAs that were grandfathered following a 1999 ruling by the Commission that such agreements made after November 5, 1996, covering the programming of more than 15% of a station's broadcast day would count toward the ownership limits for the brokering station's parent licensee. (A sale of any of the affected Allbritton properties to a separate buyer was not an option for Sinclair, as Allbritton wanted its stations to be sold together to limit the tax rate that the company would have had to pay from the accrued proceeds, which it estimated would have been substantially higher if the group was sold piecemeal; Sinclair sold most of the conflict outlets to Howard Stirk Holdings on the pretense that it would forego entering into operational agreements with Sinclair.)

After nearly a year of delays, Sinclair's deal to acquire Allbritton was approved by the FCC on July 24, 2014, and was completed on August 1, 2014. As result of the Allbritton purchase, KTUL gained new sister stations in nearby markets: Fox affiliate KOKH-TV and CW affiliate KOCB in Oklahoma City (the former of which began to share news stories with KTUL for inclusion in their respective local newscasts), and Fox affiliate KSAS-TV and its MyNetworkTV-affiliated LMA partner KMTW in Wichita.

Subchannel history

KTUL-DT2
KTUL-DT2 is the Comet-affiliated second digital subchannel of KTUL, broadcasting in standard definition on channel 8.2. On cable, KTUL-DT2 is available on Cox Communications channel 74.

KTUL launched a digital subchannel on virtual channel 8.2 in 2004, which originally operated as an in-house-produced local weather service, under the brand "First Alert Weather 24/7"; the subchannel was subsequently added by Cox Communications on digital cable channel 247 on June 2, 2005. The subchannel carried local forecast segments presented by meteorologists from the station's "First Alert Weather" team (which were recorded and updated up to three times per day); local, regional and national weather information updated via a computer automation on both the channel's main screen and an on-screen "L"-shaped ticker; and periodic live feeds of the station's Doppler radar system (then branded as "First Alert Doppler 8000"), accompanied by audio from Tulsa-based NOAA Weather Radio station KIH27. In addition, KTUL-DT2 simulcast live weather cut-ins and long-form coverage carried on the station's main channel in the event that severe weather affected the channel 8 viewing area and, to comply with FCC educational programming guidelines, carried a half-hour block of syndicated children's programs on Monday through Saturday afternoons. On October 31, 2015, KTUL-DT2 converted into a charter affiliate of Comet, a science fiction-focused network owned by Sinclair in conjunction with Metro-Goldwyn-Mayer.

KTUL-DT3
KTUL-DT3 is the Antenna TV-affiliated third digital subchannel of KTUL, broadcasting in standard definition on channel 8.3. On cable, KTUL-DT3 is available on Cox Communications channel 73. KTUL launched a digital subchannel on virtual channel 8.3 in 2004, which originally served as a standard definition simulcast of the station's primary channel. On December 15, 2008, KTUL-DT3 became an affiliate of the Retro Television Network, through a groupwide agreement between Allbritton Communications and the then-owner of the classic television network, Equity Media Holdings. The subchannel became an affiliate of Antenna TV on January 1, 2016, through a groupwide agreement between Sinclair and the network's owner, Tribune Broadcasting (which Sinclair would purchase in May 2017), that was spurred in part by the network's episode library acquisition of The Tonight Show Starring Johnny Carson.

KTUL-DT4
KTUL-DT4 is the TBD-affiliated fourth digital subchannel of KTUL, broadcasting in letterboxed standard definition on channel 8.4. The subchannel is not currently available on Cox Communications in the Tulsa market. KTUL launched a digital subchannel on virtual channel 8.4 on February 13, 2017, serving as a charter affiliate of the Sinclair-owned digital content network TBD, which soft-launched on KTUL and five other Sinclair stations on that date.

KTUL-DT5
KTUL-DT5 is the Charge!-affiliated fifth digital subchannel of KTUL, broadcasting in letterboxed standard definition on channel 8.5. The subchannel is not currently available on Cox Communications in the Tulsa market. KTUL launched a digital subchannel on virtual channel 8.5 on March 1, 2021.

Programming
KTUL currently carries the entire ABC network schedule, with program preemptions only occurring on the station to accommodate extended breaking news and severe weather coverage. ABC programs that were preempted or otherwise interrupted by local news events that warrant long-form coverage are usually tape delayed to air in overnight timeslots; although station personnel gives viewers the option to watch the affected shows the following day on ABC's desktop and mobile streaming platforms or its cable/satellite video-on-demand service. As KTUL does not carry a local newscast on weekend mornings, the station airs the live-action educational program block Litton's Weekend Adventure one hour ahead of the "live" feed (airing from 8:00 to 11:00 a.m., instead of 9:00 a.m. to 12:00 p.m.) on Saturdays, and This Week on the same hour-ahead format on Sundays. (In the former case, this limits mandatory deferrals of certain Weekend Adventure programs that are preempted in their normal Saturday timeslots for college football game broadcasts that ABC typically airs during the late morning in the Central Time Zone between late August and early December.)

Syndicated programs broadcast by KTUL include Jeopardy!, Rachael Ray, The Drew Barrymore Show, Two and a Half Men, and Wheel of Fortune. The station also produces the news/talk/lifestyle program Good Day Tulsa, which airs weekday mornings at 9:00 a.m. and is co-produced by KTUL's news and advertising sales departments; the hour-long program debuted on August 30, 2004, under original hosts D.C. Roberts, Amanda Juergens and Frank Mitchell (it is currently co-hosted by Keith Taylor, Erin Christy and meteorologist Molly McCollum, who also anchor the station's weekday morning newscast, Good Morning Oklahoma, and its weekday 11:00 a.m. newscast).

Locally produced programming
KTUL aired several popular local non-news programs over the years, several of which helped make channel 8 the leading television station in the Tulsa market and one of ABC's strongest affiliates for 35 years under Griffin-Leake and Allbritton ownership, even as ABC would not improve its viewership to become America's most-watched broadcast network until the late 1970s. One of channel 8's most popular program hosts was John Chick, who joined the station (then KTVX) in 1955. From 1955 to 1963, Chick hosted the local afternoon children's program Cartoon Zoo, a showcase of cartoon shorts on which he originated the character Mr. Zing, donning a fake moustache – which Chick had chosen for the purpose of maintaining anonymity when he was not performing the character – and zookeeper's uniform; the program was the highest-rated children's program in the Tulsa market for most of its run. The program would later evolve into Mr. Zing and Tuffy, after station director Wayne Johnson (who was promoted by KTUL management to serve as its production chief in 1970) conceived the idea for the costumed tiger character Tuffy; he was also joined by another costumed animal character, Shaggy Dog (played by Tom Ledbetter and later, Mike Denney). After Mr. Zing and Tuffy was cancelled in 1969 due to a reduction in the station's talent budget, Chick began hosting The John Chick Show, a live morning music program that featured local country music talent and square dancing. The weekday morning program proved to be a more popular alternative to network morning shows Today on KVOO and the CBS Morning News on KOTV that competed against it in the 7:00 a.m. timeslot; Chick ended his eponymous morning show in January 1979, following his diagnosis of early stage multiple sclerosis two months prior.

KTUL replaced Mr. Zing and Tuffy in 1969 with another children's program, Uncle Zeb's Cartoon Camp. For ten years, Carl Bartholemew hosted the show playing the titular gruff senior in the similarly formatted cartoon showcase, who was accompanied an array of rural characters including "Uncle Zip" (played by Dick Van Dera, who hosted a short-lived spinoff series, Uncle Zip's Do-Da-Day), "Uncle Zeke" (played by Al Clauser, who previously served as the puppeteer and voice of B.J. Bluejay on the station's iteration of The Bozo the Clown Show in the late 1950s) and "Cousin Zack" (played by Kent Doll) and featured various in-studio games in which a select member of the audience of around a dozen local children participated in between the three cartoon shorts. The program – which ended each episode with the audience members walking across a bridge in the studio to greet family and friends – was discontinued in 1979, as Bartholomew decided to focus his duties on his existing role as promotions director at channel 8. (Bartholomew would later resurrect the Uncle Zeb character in 1990, when he revived Cartoon Camp as a local public access program on United Artists Cable's Tulsa system, running for seven additional years through much of the Tulsa system's ownership under TCI.)

Another popular KTUL personality was Betty Boyd, a well-known personality at rival KOTV who was lured away to channel 8 in 1965 to host The Betty Boyd Show. The local daytime program featured a mix of interviews with Tulsa area newsmakers, community affairs and women's topics; the program – which ran until Boyd left channel 8 in 1980 to serve as the director of information for Tulsa Vo-Tech (now Tulsa Technology Center) – helped KTUL reach first place among female viewers at a time when ABC had remained lagged in third place among the three national networks in the Nielsen ratings.

Preemptions over the years and today
Historically, the station has preempted certain ABC network programs or aired them out of pattern to make room for other local or syndicated programs or, occasionally, because of internal concerns over a program's content. KTUL preempted Good Morning America for the first three years of its run from November 1975 to December 1978, in favor of airing The John Chick Show (GMAs short-lived predecessor AM America was aired on a joined-in-progress basis from January to November 1975, with KTUL choosing to preempt the first hour in favor of Chick). This move led network president Elton Rule and other ABC executives to visit the station in 1976 to discuss why KTUL did not give clearance to the then-fledgling and fast-growing ABC morning show. Network management backed off its pressure after owner Jimmy Leake informed Rule about The John Chick Shows high ratings locally. In the 1970s, KTUL was also one of several ABC affiliates that chose to preempt the network's Sunday morning cartoon rerun block.

Loving also aired mid-mornings on a one-day delay until September 1990, when the station replaced it with the hour-long version of The Home Show; KTUL preempted ABC's half-hour soap operas (Loving, The City and finally, Port Charles) until the network ceded the 12:30 p.m. Central Time slot to its affiliates in October 2003. The station also did not carry the network's daytime talk shows: Home and, throughout their entire respective runs, its successors, Mike and Maty and Caryl & Marilyn: Real Friends were not carried between September 1992 and August 1997, while The View was preempted from its debut in August 1997 until September 2000, when KTUL began clearing the program in its regular timeslot. The station preempted the Sunday edition of ABC World News Tonight until September 2002, in favor of airing infomercials in the half-hour between its local early evening newscast and ABC's Sunday night lineup.

The station had traditionally aired syndicated programs (airing in a block running anywhere from one hour to 90 minutes) following its 10 p.m. newscast for many years, resulting in certain ABC late-night programs that the network recommended its stations air immediately after their late local newscasts being delayed to accommodate them. This practice began in September 1981, when KTUL began to delay Nightline to 11:30 p.m.—an hour later than most ABC stations had carried it at the time—in order to air syndicated reruns of Hawaii Five-O following its late newscast. It never aired the program as recommended at 10:30/10:35 for the 32 years that ABC aired the newsmagazine in that timeslot; the hour following the late newscast would eventually be ceded to syndicated sitcom reruns, which have continued to fill that allocated time even after many Big Three affiliates in large and mid-sized markets began relegating carriage of off-network content to drama series aired in weekend timeslots.

As a byproduct of this, channel 8 aired Politically Incorrect with Bill Maher on a 90-minute delay from its then-recommended 11:05 p.m. Central timeslot from its ABC debut in September 1995 until its cancellation in December 2002. The talk show that replaced it, Jimmy Kimmel Live! (which has preceded Nightline since the network switched the scheduling order of the two programs in January 2013), was originally preempted by KTUL when it debuted in January 2003, after the station refused to comply with carrying the show in its recommended slot (making it one of a handful of ABC stations that included WSB-TV in Atlanta, WFTV in Orlando, WSOC-TV in Charlotte and WEAR-TV in Pensacola, Florida, not to carry Kimmel). Jimmy Kimmel Live! aired instead on WB affiliate KWBT from April 7, 2003, until April 8, 2004, after which KTUL began airing the talk show on a one-hour delay. In September 2014, KTUL pushed both Kimmel and Nightline (which had their broadcast order on ABC's late-night schedule switched by the network in January 2013) ahead a half-hour, starting at 11:07 p.m., per a request by the network that the station air both programs at earlier times; KTUL would start carrying Kimmel and Nightline in their recommended timeslots in January 2019.

KTUL ran the entire Saturday morning cartoon lineup from ABC until July 1992, when it began preempting the lineup in favor of running a two-hour-long Saturday edition of Good Morning Oklahoma and informational syndicated programs. In September 1995, when the station cut back its Saturday morning newscast to an hour-long broadcast at 7 a.m., channel 8 resumed carriage of the network's Saturday morning lineup, when it began airing four hours of the Saturday cartoon lineup from 8 a.m. to noon; it began clearing the entire lineup again in 1997. From the block's September 2002 rebranding as ABC Kids until September 2006, KTUL began timeshifting the ABC children's programs that were recommended to air during the 10 a.m. hour to air on a week-delayed basis at 5 a.m., with the remaining four hours airing in pattern from the ABC off-air feed. As other Allbritton-owned ABC stations did with the series, KTUL aired the Power Rangers series and—until it was dropped by the network in September 2006—Kim Possible on the pre-sunrise tape delay due to their lack of educational content; for similar reasons, it preempted Power Rangers outright from September 2006 until the program was dropped by ABC on August 28, 2010. (Both programs, during their respective runs on the ABC Saturday morning lineup, were cleared by nearby ABC affiliates KAKE in Wichita and KODE-TV in Joplin; as both stations provide reasonable coverage within the northern fringes of the Tulsa market, they each served as the city's default home for the preempted ABC Kids programs.)

KTUL also declined carriage of ABC's World League of American Football game broadcasts during the league's 1992 season (its last before the WLAF's two-year operational suspension), after complaints from some viewers about the games preempting its weekly broadcast of the Boston Avenue United Methodist Church Sunday services in the spring of 1991 as well as ABC declining a request by station management to join the games in progress.

News operation
, KTUL presently broadcasts 30 hours of locally produced newscasts each week (with 5½ hours each weekday, one hour on Saturdays and 1½ hours on Sundays). As the station does not produce morning newscasts on Saturdays or Sundays, channel 8 does not produce weather inserts – live or pre-recorded – during the weekend editions of ABC's Good Morning America, choosing instead to run the program's placeholder national weather map and ancillary story segments during the time normally allocated by the program for affiliates to air local news and weather inserts.

News department history
Channel 8's news department began operations when the station signed on the air on September 18, 1954, when it debuted a half-hour newscast at 10:00 p.m. The program was anchored by Jack Morris, one of the first two personalities at KTVX, alongside meteorologist Don Woods (Hal O'Halloran would join the station in 1964 as its sports director). In addition to his anchoring duties, Morris – who had worked for KTUL radio since 1940, with the exception of a three-year period in which he served in the Army during World War II – served as the station's original news director until he left to become main anchor at KVOO-TV in 1970. During his tenure at channel 8, Morris was one of the first television news anchors in the United States to use the phrase, "It's 10 o'clock. Do you know where your children are?," to open a late local newscast (shortly predating its ascension to iconic status when it was used by Tom Gregory at New York City independent station WNEW-TV [now Fox owned-and-operated station WNYW] beginning in 1967). Among Morris' notable assignments during his tenure at channel 8 was a 1956 story involving David Peterson, an infant born with a hole in the wall separating the chambers of his heart, for whom Morris pled for aid to repair the defect. The story led to donations totaling over $1,000, allowing for Peterson to be flown to the Mayo Clinic in Rochester, Minnesota for surgery. Another one of Morris' accomplishments at KTUL was the local television documentary The Five Civilized Tribes: Unfinished Journey, a one-hour documentary that took a look at the histories of Oklahoma's principal Native American tribes – Cherokee, Chickasaw, Choctaw, Creek and Seminole – in the 19th century as illustrated through paintings, which won the prestigious Edward R. Murrow Award for "Best Television Documentary" in 1966. During its early years, the station maintained a fleet of 15 vehicles and two airplanes for aerial and ground-level newsgathering.

Shortly before channel 8 (as KTVX) signed on in Muskogee, station management sought to hire a weather anchor who could draw a cartoon character. Woods – one of the few professional meteorologists on Tulsa television at the time and the first television weather anchor in Oklahoma to hold a meteorology degree – was chosen, and his cartoon character became Gusty, a boy caricature based on one which Woods created in 1953 as a meteorologist at KTVH (now Wichita-licensed KWCH-DT) in Hutchinson, Kansas, who was named through a contest held beginning the day of channel 8's sign-on. Throughout his 35-year tenure at the station, Woods drew Gusty live during his weather forecasts in a way that viewers could tell what the expected weather was by what Gusty was doing or wearing: as examples, he could be drawn waving flags and smiling for fair weather, holding an umbrella if rain was forecast or jumping in his "fraidy hole" for thunderstorms. Viewers even sent in requests for their own Gusty drawings, with Woods holding on-air drawings selecting a viewer who would win one. After Woods retired from KTUL on March 3, 1989, he continued to work as a watercolor artist and drew Gusty on occasion; Woods even authored a book entitled The Gospel According to Gusty, and one of his Gusty drawings is currently housed at the Smithsonian Institution in Washington, D.C., which received the drawing in 1970 as a representation of contemporary American art. In April 2005, the Oklahoma Legislature passed and then-Governor Brad Henry signed a state resolution designating Gusty as the state's official cartoon character.

During the 1960s, the station's local newscasts became the highest-rated in the Tulsa market, aided by the popularity of main anchor Jack Morris. After Morris left KTUL for KVOO in 1970, KOTV anchor Bob Hower joined channel 8 and took over as main anchor of its evening newscasts. The team of Hower, Woods and sports director Chris Lincoln (who left KTUL in 1976, and following subsequent stints at ABC Sports and ESPN, returned for additional runs at channel 8 from 2007 to 2011 and again beginning in January 2013) were often known as the "News Guys", in reference to a popular series of spots focusing on the main anchor team – during whose tenure, the station continued its ratings dominance in local news – that was developed by promotions director Carl Bartholomew. After James Leake sold the station to Allbritton in 1982, KTUL remained #1 in the Tulsa market throughout the 1980s and 1990s with its local newscasts and syndicated programming. This streak as the perennial leader in the Tulsa television market ended in 1999, when KOTV overtook KTUL as the area's most-watched television station.

KTUL launched a community outreach initiative in October 1980 with the debut of the "Waiting Child" series of feature segments produced in conjunction with the Oklahoma Department of Human Services (OKDHS), which profile children in OKDHS custody that either have had difficulty being placed in a permanent home (either because of their age or they are a sibling group who wants to be adopted together) or have special needs that are in need of an adoptive family. The segment – which started as a weekly feature on the Wednesday edition of channel 8's 10:00 p.m. newscast, and currently appears on the 4:00 p.m. newscast each Wednesday and on Saturdays during the 10:00 p.m. newscast – was initially conducted by Bob Hower; after Hower's retirement from television broadcasting following his diagnosis of spasmodic dysphonia in 1986, the segment was hosted by Rea Blakey (1986–1988, during her final years as weeknight co-anchor), and later, by John Walls (1986–1989, while serving as the station's sports director). Carole Lambert – who came to 1982 as a weekend evening anchor, before moving to the weeknight broadcasts in 1988, where she spent most of her tenure co-anchoring with Charles Ely – was the longest serving host of the segment, taking over those duties in June 1990 and reporting for the feature until Lambert retired from KTUL in 2011. Lambert's tenure as segment host saw her be honored, through nomination by now-former U.S. Representative Brad Carson, with a 2004 "Angels in Adoption" award by the Congressional Coalition on Adoption Institute. The Waiting Child segment – which features the Oleta Adams song "(I'm a) Waiting Child", which was composed by Hower – has been credited in the adoption of more than 4,000 Oklahoma children. Since 2011, the segment has been hosted by Keith Taylor (who joined KTUL in 2001 as a news and sports reporter, before becoming weekday morning co-anchor in 2003).

The station's morning newscast, Good Morning Oklahoma (GMO), debuted on June 11, 1990, as a 60-minute broadcast from 6:00 to 7:00 a.m. (The program would expand to 1½ hours in September 1999, then to two hours in September 2003, and finally to 2½ hours, with the September 7, 2010 premiere of 4:30 a.m. extension "Good Morning Oklahoma - Rise & Shine".) It was originally anchored by former KOTV anchor Karen Larsen (who would later become an evening anchor at KJRH) and Clark Powell (who had previously served as weekend anchor at KAUZ-TV in Wichita Falls); the program – which initially featured a mix of news, weather and interviews, before evolving into a more traditional news-based morning show by 2005 – was the first local morning newscast to debut in the Tulsa market. On May 30, 1992, KTUL launched the market's first weekend morning newscast when it debuted a Saturday edition of GMO from 8:00 to 10:00 a.m., taking over part of the timeslot that the station had previously allotted to ABC's children's cartoon lineup (the newscast would be reduced to one hour starting at 7:00 a.m. by September 1995, where the Saturday broadcast would remain until it was discontinued in September 2000; as a result, KTUL is currently the Tulsa market's only Big Four affiliate without a newscast on weekend mornings, since KOTV launched weekend editions of its Six in the Morning broadcast in March 2015). The program made national news in 1995, when meteorologist Frank Mitchell (who would eventually serve as KTUL's chief meteorologist from 2005 to 2012) surprised his co-anchor and girlfriend, Teri Bowers (who joined KTUL alongside Mitchell in 1990 and remained with the station until 2006, serving most of her tenure alongside Mitchell on Good Morning Oklahoma, originally as the co-hosts of the Saturday edition and later on the weekday broadcasts), with a live, on-air wedding proposal. The proposal was featured on various syndicated and network programs such as American Journal, Geraldo and Maury. Subsequently, during a January 2013 GMO broadcast, weekday morning meteorologist Andrew Kozak (a former meteorologist at KOKI-TV, who worked at channel 8 from June 2012 to September 2014) hand-drew the weather forecast after a computer that supplied its weather graphics crashed. A clip of the segment was featured on several national news programs including Good Morning America and Anderson Cooper 360°, the latter of which had its titular host refer to Kozak's segment as the "Best Forecast Ever".

1990 also saw KTUL become the first television station in Oklahoma to offer closed captioning of its newscasts for deaf and hard of hearing viewers. In 1993, KTUL partnered with Oklahoma City ABC affiliate KOCO-TV to pool resources for severe weather coverage; the partnership – which was developed by Travis Meyer, who served as the station's chief meteorologist from 1989 until 2005, when he took over that same position at rival KOTV – allowed for the utilization of the "First Pix" cellular-to-broadcast photo transmission technology developed by Cellular One to relay footage of severe weather on the stations' respective newscasts as well as their respective ground and airborne storm chasing units. On January 3, 1994, under a partnership with TCI Cablevision of Tulsa, KTUL began producing six-minute-long local newscasts for Headline News under the channel's Local Edition insert format, which aired in half-hour intervals at :25 and :55 minutes past the hour each weekday between 9:00 a.m. and 10:00 p.m. on TCI channel 30 in place of Headline News's national lifestyle segments. In November 1999, KTUL began utilizing "Live Doppler 8000", a Doppler radar system that utilizes live VIPIR data from radars operated by National Weather Service radar sites out of Tulsa; Oklahoma City; Wichita; Fort Smith, Arkansas and Springfield, Missouri for use by station meteorologists for weather segments within its newscasts and for severe weather cut-ins. On September 7, 2004, channel 8 became the first Tulsa station to debut a late afternoon newscast at 4:00 p.m.; the half-hour program would bounce within that hour in later years, first moving to 4:30 p.m. on September 8, 2008, then being shifted back to its original timeslot on September 7, 2010.

On August 22, 2011, KTUL became the third television station in the Tulsa market (after NBC affiliate KJRH and Fox affiliate KOKI) to begin broadcasting its local newscasts in high definition. In September 2012, channel 8 became the first station in Tulsa to employ a female chief meteorologist, when it hired Jennifer Zeppelin in that position on the weekday evening newscasts; Zeppelin – who had joined KTUL as a fill-in meteorologist in December 2011, after having served as a meteorologist at CBS owned-and-operated station KCNC-TV in Denver – left the station in August 2015. On May 6, 2012, the station premiered Ford Sports Xtra, a sports highlight and discussion show that aired Sunday nights after the late-evening newscast, which focused primarily on college athletics and professional sports around Oklahoma; the program replaced You Make the Call, a sports call-in and discussion program that debuted on the station on September 6, 1998. Ford Sports Xtra was discontinued on April 2, 2017, and was replaced on April 9 with a half-hour extension of the Sunday 10:00 p.m. newscast under the title Tulsa’s Channel 8 Extra. KTUL premiered an hour-long newscast at 11:00 a.m. on September 11, 2017, which marked the first time that the station has offered a local newscast during the weekday midday timeslot and made it the last news-producing station in Tulsa to offer one; until August 2018, it competed against an hour-long midday newscast that aired in that timeslot on KJRH.

In recent years, KTUL has traditionally ranked second in terms of total day news viewership, behind CBS affiliate KOTV. However, since the early 2010s, the station places a strong third among the local television news outlets in the Tulsa market, behind KOTV and Fox affiliate KOKI-TV, with which it trades places for that position; channel 8's 10:00 p.m. newscast usually places second in the market behind KOTV, and ahead of KJRH and KOKI-TV.

Notable current on-air staff
 Chris Lincoln – sports director; also part-time sports reporter

Notable former on-air staff
 John Anderson – weekend sports anchor (1988–1990; now at ESPN)
 Betty Boyd – host of The Betty Boyd Show (1965–1980; later Oklahoma House of Representatives for the 23rd Legislative District from 1991 to 2000, now deceased)
 Mike Denney – performer on Mr. Zing and Tuffy/director/production manager (1966–1975; now a television director)
 Travis Meyer – chief meteorologist (1989–2006; now at KOTV-DT)
 Jeanne Tripplehorn (aka Jeanne Summers) – host of the music video program Night Shift (1982–1985; now a film and television actress)
 Don Woods – chief meteorologist (1954–1989; deceased)

Technical information

Subchannels
The station's digital signal is multiplexed:

Analog-to-digital conversion
KTUL shut down its analog signal, over VHF channel 8, at 9:00 a.m. on June 12, 2009 (with a ceremonial switchover airing on that morning's broadcast of Good Day Tulsa), the official date on which full-power television stations transitioned from analog to digital broadcasts under federal mandate. The station's digital signal remained on its pre-transition VHF channel 10. Through the use of PSIP, digital television receivers display the station's virtual channel as its former VHF analog channel 8.

KTUL also operates a digital fill-in translator on UHF channel 24, which serves the southern part of the viewing area, including McAlester. The station has also filed an application with the Federal Communications Commission to operate a second fill-in translator in Caney, Kansas, which will also broadcast on UHF channel 24, to serve northern portions of the market, including Bartlesville, and portions of southeastern Kansas that receive a weaker signal or have completely lost access to KTUL's main signal following the digital transition.

References

External links
 KTUL.com - KTUL official website
 
 
 A website of the history of Tulsa Television and radio stations

TUL
ABC network affiliates
Comet (TV network) affiliates
Antenna TV affiliates
TBD (TV network) affiliates
Charge! (TV network) affiliates
Television channels and stations established in 1954
1954 establishments in Oklahoma
Sinclair Broadcast Group
Low-power television stations in the United States